Éric Hollingsworth du Plessis is an author, translator and educator living in Virginia. He is a professor at Radford University, where he teaches writing in the Department of English.

Du Plessis has written or translated several books on philosophy and literature, as well as articles, book chapters and encyclopedia entries. He has published on linguistics, translation and historical/cultural studies in such journals and encyclopedias as Revue de Littérature Comparée, Poe Studies, European Studies Journal, Dalhousie French Studies, Cahiers du CIRhill, Short Story Criticism, The Linacre Quarterly, Les Amis de Flaubert, The World Education Encyclopedia, ALFA, and the World Press Encyclopedia.

Early life 
Du Plessis was born in France to Jean-Pierre, a World War II veteran with the British SAS and architect, and Simone Jeanne, a therapist for dyslexic children. After a stint in medical school at the University of Paris, he immigrated to the US and settled in Richmond, Virginia. He attended Virginia Commonwealth University, supporting himself by cleaning floors at Johnston-Willis Hospital, working as a waiter, a substitute teacher at an all-black school, and as a police officer. After graduating from VCU with a degree in philosophy, he studied at the University of Richmond, where he received a master's degree. He went on to the University of Virginia at Charlottesville, Virginia, where he received his Ph.D. in French literature and General Linguistics. Du Plessis then relocated to College Station, Texas where he worked as an assistant professor at Texas A&M University for seven years. He eventually returned to Virginia and became a full professor at Radford University, where after thirty-seven years he still teaches today in the department of English. As a life-long hobby, he has also been active in the field of Japanese martial arts and taught Aiki-jitsu for forty years.

Publications 
 The Nineteenth-Century French Novel: A Reader's Path to Classic Fiction. Mellen, 2013. Reviewed in Romance Quarterly, Vol. 62, No. 2 (2014): 151-152, and in Nineteenth-Century French Studies, Vol. 42, No. 3&4 (2014). 
 Exiled From Paris: Growing up French in the 1960s. (CreateSpace and Amazon, 2009; revised, second edition 2012), reviewed in Modern and Contemporary France (Routledge, London), Vol. 18 (2010): 127-129, and in The University of Virginia Magazine, Vol. XCIX, No. 3 (2010): 58.
 Honore de Balzac's Wann-Chlore.  Mellen, 2005. Translated from the French. Reviewed by Mary Wellington in Nineteenth-Century French Studies, Vol. 35, No. 3 (2007): 676-677, and by Stephane Vachon in L'Annee Balzacienne Vol. XXIII (2008): 452-454.
 The NightCharmer and Other Tales of Claude Seignolle. Texas A&M University Press, 1983, Translated from the French with a preface by Lawrence Durrell. Reviewed by Jack Sullivan in The New York Times Book Review, Vol. 89. February 26, 1984, p.22, and in Choice, Vol. 21 (1984): 985.
 Nietzsche en France, 1891-1915 with a preface by Michel Guerin. UPA, 1982. Reviewed by William Carter in The French Review, vol. 59. No. 1 (1985): 139-140,  C.H. More in Canadian Review of Comparative Literature, Vol. X, No. 3 (1983): 447-450, and Robert Bessede in Revue d'Histoire Litteraire de la France, Vol. 86 (1986): 158.

Education 
 Former student, University of Paris Medical School
 B.A., Virginia Commonwealth University
 M.A., University of Richmond
 Ph.D., University of Virginia

References

External links
 Radford University:  Department of Foreign Languages and Literature; Dr. Eric H. du Plessis

1950 births
Living people
French emigrants to the United States
University of Paris alumni
Virginia Commonwealth University alumni
University of Richmond alumni
University of Virginia alumni
Radford University faculty
French educators
20th-century French educators
21st-century French educators